The Pathans of Punjab, also called Punjabi Afghans or Punjabi Pathans are originally Pashtun people, an Iranian ethnic group, who have settled in the Punjab region of Pakistan and India. They were originally from the Pashtunistan region of Pakistan and Afghanistan. Most of these Pashtun communities are scattered throughout the Punjab and have over time assimilated into the Punjabi society and culture.

These non-frontier Pathans are usually known by the town or locality in which they are settled, e.g., Lodhianvi Pathans, Jalandari Pathans, or Lahori.

History and origin 

Colonies of Pathans (Pashtun people) arriving in Punjab are accounted for by Sir Densil Ibbetson in the following manner:

The oral tradition of Pathans has that they are descendants of the soldiers of Alexander the Great who invaded the area in 327–323 BC. Archaeological evidence, however,  suggests a Greek influence before this invasion. A phylogenetic study investigated the possible genetic relation of Pathans with Greeks and found evidence of a limited contributions of Greek genes in the Pathan population.

Main divisions

Malerkotla Pathans 
In the Indian Punjabi city of Malerkotla, sixty-five percent of the total population is Muslim and out of this population, twenty percent are Punjabi Pathans.

These Pathans trace their ancestry to Shaikh Sadruddin, a pious man of the Sherwani/Sarwani tribe of the Darband area of what is now the North-West Frontier Province of Pakistan. Behlol Lodhi (1451–1517), the Afghan king who had most of the western parts of India under his control, desired to rule Delhi and on his way, he was caught in a sand drift. While there was nothing visible in the darkness, the King spotted a dim light of a lamp still burning in the wind. It was the hut of Shaikh Sadruddin and when the king found out, he came to the hut to show his respect and asked the holy man to pray for him to bear a son and have victory. During 1451 and 1452, the king married off his daughter Taj Murassa to Shaikh Sadruddin after being enthroned in Delhi, and also gave him the area of Malerkotla. The descendants of Shaikh Sadruddin branched into two groups. One started ruling the state and were given the title of Nawab. The other branch lived around the Shrine of Shaikh Sadruddin, controlling its revenue.

One notable thing about the Punjabi Pathans of Malerkotla is the fact the women strictly observe pardah, albeit they are no longer required to wear the burqa. In regards to language, Pashto was their primary language until 1903. Afterwards, the Malerkotla Pathans began to speak Punjabi and Hindustani. In the city, there are twenty-nine shrines to saints from Afghanistan, whom the Malerkotla Pathans revere. Although the level of education is low among the community, many of these Pathans serve in the civil service, particularly in the Indian Police Service. Others maintain businesses, rent property, and rear horses. Because the level of religiosity amongst Malerkotla Pathans is high, many families sent their children to madrasahs where Qur'anic education is compulsory. For higher education, many children study in schools in Patiala or Ludhiana.

Multani Pathans 
The descendants of Zamand very early migrated in large numbers to Multan, to which province they furnished rulers, till the reign of the Mughal Emperor Aurangzeb, when a number of the Abdali tribe under the leadership of Shah Husain were driven from Kandahar by tribal feuds, took refuge in Multan, and being early supplemented by other of their kinsmen who were expelled by Mir Wais, the great Ghilzai chief, conquered Multan and founded the tribe well known in the Punjab as Multani Pathans.

Their main clans were the Alizai, Badozai, Bamzai and Saddozai, all clans of the Durrani tribe. Other tribal communities include the Safi (Pashtun tribe), Babar, Khakwani, Tareen.
In Muzaffargarh District, the Pathans of the district are related to the Multani Pathans. They settled in Muzaffargarh in the 18th century, as small groups of Multani Pathan expended their control from the city of Multan. There distribution is as follows; the Alizai Durrani are found at Lalpur, and the Popalzai are found in Docharkha, while the Babars are based in Khangarh and Tareen in Kuhawar are other important tribes.

Punjabi-Pathans of Pashtun ethnicity

 Rahimuddin Khan, military officer who served as the 7th governor of Balochistan and 16th governor of Sindh.
 Justice Muhammad Munir, Chief Justice of Pakistan
 Ghulam Muhammad, Governor General of Pakistan

 Bilal Khan, singer-songwriter, composer and actor.
 Asma Jahangir
 Junaid Khan, actor and singer
 Imran Khan Niazi, Former cricketer and Former Prime Minister of Pakistan
 Jehangir Khan Tareen Former Minister for Industries
 Dr. Nazir Ahmed OBE, Pakistani scientist, bureaucrat and founding chairman of the Pakistan Atomic Energy Commission
 Shaukat Tarin Former Finance Minister of Pakistan
 Nawabzada Nasrullah Khan Babar Senior Politician 

 Munir Ahmad Khan, Pakistani nuclear scientist and engineer
 Ishaq Khan Khakwani, Former Federal Minister of State for Pakistan Railways And IT & Telecom
 Javed Burki, Pakistani cricketer
 Maulana Kausar Niazi, former Federal Minister
 Amir Abdullah Khan Rokhri, former Senator
 Gul Hameed Khan Rokhri, politician
 Amir Abdullah Khan Rokhri, politician and member of Pakistan Movement
 Humair Hayat Khan Rokhri, member of the National Assembly of Pakistan
 Agha Muhammad Yahya Khan, 3rd President of Pakistan  
 Amir Abdullah Khan Niazi, Sitara-i-Jurat twice and Military Cross
 Tariq Niazi, Pakistani field hockey player
 Aamir Hayat Khan Niazi, member of the Punjab Provincial Assembly
 Munir Niazi, a poet of Urdu and Punjabi languages
 Shahryar Khan, foreign secretary and Chairman PCB
 Tariq Mahmood Khan, Interior Secretary and Member Public Service Commission
 Zulfiqar Ali Khan, Pakistan Air Force Chief of Air Staff
 Tariq Kamal Khan, Pakistan Navy Chief of Naval Staff
 Karamat Rahman Niazi Pakistan Navy Chief of Naval Staff
 Misbah-ul-Haq, Pakistani cricketer
 Intikhab Alam, Pakistani cricketer
 Fawad Khan, actor.
 Ali Rehman Khan, actor.

See also 

Pashtun
Pashtun diaspora
Rohilla
Pashtuns
Pathans of Bihar
Pathans of Kashmir
Pathans of Gujarat
Pathans of Sindh
Pathans of Uttar Pradesh
Pathans of Rajasthan
Muhajir people

References 

Punjab
Pashtun tribes
Punjabi tribes
Saraiki tribes
Social groups of Pakistan
Pashtun diaspora in India